The 1964 United States presidential election in Texas was held on November 3, 1964, as part of the 1964 United States presidential election. The Democratic Party candidate, incumbent President Lyndon B. Johnson, comfortably won his home state of Texas with 63.32% of the vote against the Republican Party candidate, Senator Barry Goldwater of Arizona, who won 36.5%, giving him the state's 25 electoral votes and a victory margin of 26.8 percentage points. Johnson won the 1964 election in a landslide, carrying 44 states plus the District of Columbia, which participated for the first time. Goldwater only carried his home state of Arizona along with five Deep South states which had been historically Democratic, but defected to the Republican Party due to the Democratic Party’s support for civil rights.

This would be the last time the counties containing the five largest cities in Texas, consisting of Houston, San Antonio, Dallas, Austin, and Fort Worth, would vote Democratic at the same time until 2020.

Analysis
The home state of President Lyndon B. Johnson, Texas was easily his best state in the former Confederacy, although he did better still in four of the five border states. Overall Texas was Johnson’s nineteenth best state in the election and weighed in at 4.25% points more Democratic than the national average. Johnson won every region in the state by wide margins, including those which had begun trending Republican in recent presidential elections such as the Texas Panhandle, the Dallas–Fort Worth metroplex, and Metro Houston. Every major city in the state voted for Johnson, including every mid-sized city with the exceptions of Odessa, Midland, Tyler, and Longview, which were won by Goldwater.

Two counties in the northern Panhandle, Ochiltree and Roberts, gave Goldwater over sixty percent of the vote, further reflecting this region’s trend towards the Republican Party. Given that it was also Johnson’s home county, Gillespie County in the Texas Hill Country voted Democratic for the only time since Franklin D. Roosevelt’s landslide in the 1932 election, in which he carried every county. This is the only presidential election between 1952 and 2008 that Dallas and Harris counties voted for the Democratic candidate. Dallas in particular likely swung towards Johnson due to the city still being in mourning from the assassination of President John F. Kennedy, which had occurred less than a year before the election. Despite this strong swing, Johnson only carried Dallas County by a 9.6% margin.

President Johnson carried 238 out of the state’s 254 counties, and all twenty-three congressional districts. The 1964 election marks the last time a Democratic candidate for president won Texas with over sixty percent of the vote, won the state with a double-digit margin, and carried any counties with over ninety percent of the vote (in this case, the South Texas counties of Duval and Webb). Webb, Duval and Jim Hogg counties stood among the four most Democratic in the nation.

Aside from Johnson's home county Gillespie as mentioned above, this remains the last election as of the 2020 presidential election in which the counties of Andrews, Austin, Bandera, Brazos, Collin, Comal, Cooke, Crane, Dawson, Deaf Smith, Denton, DeWitt, Guadalupe, Hartley, Hemphill, Irion, Kerr, Kimble, Loving, Lubbock, McMullen, Montgomery, Potter, Reagan, Runnels, Rusk, Schleicher, Sterling, Sutton, Taylor, Tom Green, Upton, Uvalde, Victoria, Washington, Winkler, and Yoakum voted for the Democratic presidential candidate. Dallas County and Harris County, the two most populous in the state, would not vote Democratic again until Barack Obama won them in 2008; Fort Bend County, a Houston suburb, would not vote Democratic again until Hillary Clinton won it in 2016; and Tarrant County, the third most populous county and home to the long-conservative Fort Worth suburbs, would not vote Democratic  again until Joe Biden won it in 2020. This is also the last time a Democratic candidate won every county in the Texas Triangle.

Results

Results by county

See also
 United States presidential elections in Texas

References

1964 Texas elections
Texas
1964